Judo at the 2020 Summer Paralympics in Tokyo took place at the Nippon Budokan from 27 to 29 August 2021. There were 138 qualified slots (80 male, 58 female) in 13 events: 7 male events and 6 female events.

The 2020 Summer Olympic and Paralympic Games were postponed to 2021 due to the COVID-19 pandemic. They kept the 2020 name and were held from 24 August to 5 September 2021.

Qualification
A total of 138 athletes could qualify for judo at the 2021 Summer Paralympics. Each NPC could enter a maximum of 13 athletes, one per event, with the exception of Bipartite invitees. Qualification spots were allocated through one of four methods:
Top ranked class B1 athletes (highest disability class) at the IBSA Judo 2020 Extended World Ranking.
Top ranked athletes at the IBSA Judo 2020 Extended World Ranking without restrictions.
Top ranked athlete from the host country in each event. If the slot is unused, it is allocated through the Bipartite Commission Invitation Allocation method.
The IPC and IBSA Judo invite one athlete per event for a Bipartite Commission slot.

The number of qualification spots per method is as follow:

Competition schedule

Participating nations

A total of 136 athletes from 41 entered the paralympic games, according to the following table.

Medal summary

Medal table

Men's events

Women's events

See also
Judo at the 2020 Summer Olympics

References

External links
Results book 

 
2020
2020 Summer Paralympics events
Paralympics
Paralympics 2021